The following is a partial list of the "A" codes for Medical Subject Headings (MeSH), as defined by the United States National Library of Medicine (NLM).

This list continues the information at List of MeSH codes (A15). Codes following these are found at List of MeSH codes (A17). For other MeSH codes, see List of MeSH codes.

The source for this content is the set of 2006 MeSH Trees from the NLM.

– embryonic structures

– embryo
  – amniotic fluid
  – blastocyst
  – blastoderm
  – trophoblasts
  – blastomeres
  – branchial region
  – cleavage stage, ovum
  – blastula
  – morula
  – cloaca
  – embryo, nonmammalian
  – chick embryo
  – chorioallantoic membrane
  – cleavage stage, ovum
  – blastula
  – morula
  – yolk sac
  – extraembryonic membranes
  – allantois
  – amnion
  – chorion
  – chorionic villi
  – yolk sac
  – gastrula
  – germ layers
  – ectoderm
  – endoderm
  – mesoderm
  – pericytes
  – somites
  – limb bud
  – mesonephros
  – mullerian ducts
  – neural crest
  – notochord
  – organizers, embryonic
  – umbilical cord
  – umbilical arteries
  – umbilical veins
  – urachus
  – vitelline duct
  – wolffian duct

– fetus
  – aborted fetus
  – fetal blood
  – fetal heart
  – ductus arteriosus
  – truncus arteriosus
  – meconium
  – vernix caseosa

– ovum
  – egg yolk
  – vitelline membrane
  – zona pellucida

– placenta
  – chorionic villi
  – decidua
  – deciduoma
  – trophoblasts

– zygote

The list continues at List of MeSH codes (A17).

A16